Moidele Bickel (6 March 1937 in Munich – 16 May 2016 in Berlin) was a German costume designer. She was also known by the name Bernadette Vilard.

Early life
She was born in Munich, Germany and began her career in as a costume designer in Frankfurt.

Career
Bickel began her career as a costume designer at the Theater am Turm in Frankfurt am Main. In 1970, Bickel moved to Berlin to provide the costumes for Peter Stein's productions for 22 years. She first worked with Stein at the Schaubühne am Halleschen Ufer and from 1981 on the Schaubühne am Lehniner Platz.

She was nominated for the Academy Award for Best Costume Design for her work in the film Queen Margot (1994).

Death and legacy
She died on 16 May 2016 in Berlin.

References

External links

1937 births
2016 deaths
Best Costume Design BAFTA Award winners
German costume designers
Women costume designers